Cristian Ignacio Paz (born 24 April 1995) is an Argentine footballer who plays as a centre-back for Liga I club FC Voluntari.

References

External links
Profile at Futbolpasion

1995 births
Living people
Argentine footballers
Argentine expatriate footballers
Sportspeople from Buenos Aires Province
Association football defenders
Club Atlético Temperley footballers
FC Karpaty Lviv players
Club Atlético San Miguel footballers
San Martín de San Juan footballers
Deportivo Morón footballers
Primera Nacional players
Primera B Metropolitana players
Liga I players 
FC Voluntari players
Expatriate footballers in Ukraine
Argentine expatriate sportspeople in Ukraine
Expatriate footballers in Romania
Argentine expatriate sportspeople in Romania